Two Pin Din are a two-piece indie rock band based in the Netherlands and Belgium, formed in 2005 by musicians Andy Kerr and Wilf Plum, formerly of the bands Nomeansno and Dog Faced Hermans, respectively.  Lacking a rhythm section, the band consists of the two members each singing and playing electric guitar. They released their debut album, In Case of Fire Break Glass, in 2008. In 2014, Two Pin Din put out a four song extended play featuring the words and vocals of G.W. Sok.

Discography
In Case of Fire Break Glass CD (2008)
Gifts, Milk and Things EP Double 7" vinyl with G.W. Sok (2014)

External links
Official home page
Official Facebook page

Dutch musical groups